Sir Audley Mervyn (died 1675) was an MP for County Tyrone and Speaker of the Irish House of Commons.

Audley Mervyn may also refer to:

 Audley Mervyn (died 1717), Irish MP for Strabane and County Tyrone - see Tyrone (Parliament of Ireland constituency)
 Audley Mervyn (died 1746), Irish MP for County Tyrone - see Tyrone (Parliament of Ireland constituency)